Iván Gutiérrez López (born 16 February 1998) is a professional footballer. Born in the United States, he represented the Mexico national under-17 team.

Career
After playing four seasons with the academy team of Chivas USA in his native California, Gutiérrez moved to the team's parent club Guadalajara in Mexico. He appeared for both the Chivas Guadalajara Fuerzas Básicas Sub-20 team, scoring 7 goals in 17 appearances, and Guadalajara Premier, where he scored 3 goals in 33 appearances.

On 3 June 2019, Gutiérrez joined USL Championship side LA Galaxy II.

Gutiérrez signed with Phoenix Rising FC on 7 December 2020.

Orange County SC then signed Gutiérrez to a 25-day contract on 31 May 2022. Guriérrez was sold to USL League One side Chattanooga Red Wolves on 16 September 2022.

Honours
Mexico U17
 CONCACAF U-17 Championship: 2015

References

1998 births
Living people
Soccer players from California
Mexican footballers
Mexico youth international footballers
American soccer players
American sportspeople of Mexican descent
C.D. Guadalajara footballers
LA Galaxy II players
Phoenix Rising FC players
Orange County SC players
Chattanooga Red Wolves SC players
Association football midfielders
USL Championship players
USL League One players